The Kokomo Dodgers were a Minor League Baseball team based in Kokomo, Indiana, between 1955 and 1961. The 1956 Dodgers were a charter member of the Midwest League, as the Mississippi–Ohio Valley League changed names. Kokomo was an affiliate of the Brooklyn/Los Angeles Dodgers from 1956 to 1961, after initially playing as a New York Giants affiliate in 1955, during which time they were known as the Kokomo Giants.

Baseball Hall of Fame member Orlando Cepeda played for the 1955 team.

History
In 1955, Kokomo replaced the Danville Dans in the Mississippi-Ohio Valley League, playing as the Kokomo Giants, an affiliate of the San Francisco Giants. The next season, the Kokomo Dodgers became an charter member of newly formed Midwest League, which grew out of the Mississippi-Ohio Valley League. The other seven Midwest League charter franchises were the Clinton Pirates, Dubuque Packers, Decatur Commodores, Michigan City White Caps, Paris Lakers, Lafayette Red Sox and Mattoon Phillies.

Former Dodger Pete Reiser was the team's manager during the 1956 and 1957 seasons.  The team won the Midwest League pennant in 1957, but lost in the playoffs.

The Ballpark
The team played at Highland Park Stadium.

Notable alumni

Baseball Hall of Fame alumni
 Orlando Cepeda (1955) Inducted, 1999

Notable alumni
 Mike Brumley (1957)
 Tommy Davis (1957) 3x MLB All–Star; 2× NL Batting Champion (1962, 1963); 1962 NL RBI Leader
 Tim Harkness (1957)
 Clarence Jones (1961)
 Bill Kelso (1961)
 Don Miles (1956)
 Rod Miller (1959)
 Ed Palmquist (1956)
 Pete Reiser (1956–1957, MGR) 3x MLB All–Star; 1941 NL Batting Champion; 2× NL Stolen Base Leader (1942, 1946)
 Nate Smith (1956)
 Hector Valle (1960)

See also
Kokomo Dodgers players

References

External links
Baseball Reference
Midwest League Guide – Kokomo history

Defunct Midwest League teams
Los Angeles Dodgers minor league affiliates
Brooklyn Dodgers minor league affiliates
New York Giants minor league affiliates
Kokomo, Indiana
1956 establishments in Indiana
1961 disestablishments in Indiana
Sports in Kokomo, Indiana
Defunct baseball teams in Indiana
Baseball teams disestablished in 1961
Baseball teams established in 1956